UNESCO's City of Music programme is part of the wider Creative Cities Network.

The Network launched in 2004, and has member cities in seven creative fields.  The other fields are: Crafts and Folk Art, Design, Film, Gastronomy, Literature, and Media Arts.

Criteria for Cities of Music

To be approved as a City of Music, cities need to meet a number of criteria set by UNESCO.

Designated UNESCO Cities of Music share similar characteristics:
 recognised centres of musical creation and activity
 experience in hosting music festivals and events at a national or international level
 promotion of the music industry in all its forms
 music schools, conservatories, academies, and higher education institutions specialised in music
 informal structures for music education, including amateur choirs and orchestras
 domestic or international platforms dedicated to particular genres of music and/or music from other countries
 cultural spaces suited for practicing and listening to music, e.g. open-air auditoriums.

About the cities

In March 2006, Seville was designated as the first City of Music.  Bologna was named approximately two months later.

Seville has a "legendary Flamenco scene," and UNESCO lists Flamenco as an "intangible cultural heritage."

Hamamatsu is the founding city of musical instrument companies Yamaha, Kawai, and Roland. It has also an Museum of Musical Instruments.

Liverpool—"the city that spawned The Beatles"—earned its designation due to music's "place in the heart of the city's life."  UNESCO also noted a "clearly defined" music, education, and skills strategy for young people.

Idanha-a-Nova "lives by the rhythm of music," Ghent is a "city full of culture," and Auckland is the "beating heart of New Zealand's music industry."

Adelaide is "sophisticated, cultured, and neat-casual," Daegu is a "pleasant and progressive place," and Leiria is an "agreeable mixture of medieval and modern."

Cities of Music

As of 2021, fifty Cities of Music have been designated by UNESCO.

Nineteen of the participating cities are European, ten are Asian and Middle Eastern. South America and North America each have six, Africa has four, and two have been designated in Oceania.

Seven countries have two member cities.  Colombia, Portugal, and the United Kingdom are the only countries to have three designated cities.

The Cities of Music are:

See also
City of Gastronomy
City of Literature
City of Film
Design Cities (UNESCO)
City of Crafts and Folk Arts
Music of Adelaide

References
Belfast: https://en.unesco.org/creative-cities/belfast
Musical culture
UNESCO
Lists of cities